Dorland Memorial Presbyterian Church is historic Presbyterian church located on Bridge Street at Meadow Lane in Hot Springs, Madison County, North Carolina.  It was designed by architect Richard Sharp Smith and built in 1900. It is a cruciform plan church with a splayed, gable roof, pebbledash exterior, and Gothic windows.  Atop the roof is a four sided belfry surmounted by an octagonal steeple.

It was added to the National Register of Historic Places in 1986.

References

Presbyterian churches in North Carolina
Churches on the National Register of Historic Places in North Carolina
Churches completed in 1900
19th-century Presbyterian church buildings in the United States
Churches in Madison County, North Carolina
National Register of Historic Places in Madison County, North Carolina